Andricus is a genus of oak gall wasps in the family Cynipidae.

Life cycle
As in all Hymenoptera, sex-determination in species of the genus Andricus is governed by haplodiploidy: males develop from unfertilized eggs and are haploid, and females develop from fertilized eggs and are diploid.

Many species in the genus alternate between an asexual generation and a sexual generation.

Species
The taxonomy of the genus Andricus is uncertain, with many of the approximately 375 species considered dubious. The following species are currently recognised in the genus Andricus: 

 Andricus aciculatus Beutenmuller, 1909
 Andricus ahmeti Melika, Mutun & Dinç, 2014
 Andricus albicomus Weld, 1952
 Andricus albipes Hartig, 1840
 Andricus albobalani Weld, 1926
 Andricus alniensis Folliot, 1964
 Andricus amblycerus (Giraud, 1859)
 Andricus amenti Giraud, 1859
 Andricus amphorus (Weld, 1926)
 Andricus analis (Fonscolombe, 1832)
 Andricus anatolicus Melika, Mutun & Dinç, 2014
 Andricus apiarium (Weld, 1944)
 Andricus archiboldi Melika & Abrahamson, 2021
 Andricus aries (Girauld, 1859)
 Andricus arslani Azmaz & Katılmış, 2022
 Andricus assarehi Melika & Sadeghi, 2008
 Andricus atkinsonae Melika, Stone, Sadeghi & Zargaran, 2008
 Andricus atrimentus Kinsey, 1922) — striped volcano gall wasp
 Andricus bakkeri (Lyon, 1984)
 Andricus bakrachus Melika, Mutun & Dinç, 2014
 Andricus balanaspis (Weld, 1922)
 Andricus balanella (Weld, 1957)
 Andricus barriosi Medianero & Nieves-Aldrey, 2019
 Andricus biconicus Weld, 1959
 Andricus bimaculatus (Schenck, 1863)
 Andricus brachycentrus (Thomson, 1877)
 Andricus breviramuli Pujade-Villar, 2014
 Andricus brunneus Fullaway, 1911 — clustered gall wasp
 Andricus bulgaricus Vasileva-Symnalieva, 1978
 Andricus burgundus Giraud, 1859
 Andricus burnetti Dailey & Sprenger, 1983
 Andricus caepula (Weld, 1926)
 Andricus caliciformis (Giraud, 1859)
 Andricus californicum (Beutenmueller, 1892)
 Andricus californicus Ashmead, 1885
 Andricus callidoma (Hartig, 1841)
 Andricus capillatus (Weld, 1927)
 Andricus caputmedusae (Hartig, 1843)
 Andricus catalinensis Melika, Nicholls & Stone, 2021
 Andricus catilla (Darboux & Houard, 1907)
 Andricus cecconii Kieffer, 1901
 Andricus chapmanii Melika & Abrahamson, 2021
 Andricus chico Weld, 1957
 Andricus chinquapin (Fitch, 1859) — small oak spindle gall wasp
 Andricus chiricahuensis Melika, Nicholls & Stone, 2021
 Andricus chodjaii Melika, 2008 
 Andricus chrysolepidicola Ashmead, 1896 — irregular spindle gall wasp
 Andricus cinnamomeus Ashmead, 1887
 Andricus clarkei (Bassett, 1890)
 Andricus clementinae (Giraud, 1859)
 Andricus coconinoensis Melika, Nicholls & Stone, 2021
 Andricus columbiensis Melika, Nicholls & Stone, 2021
 Andricus comata Weld, 1956
 Andricus confusus Lobato-Vila & Pujade-Villar, 2019
 Andricus confertus McCracken & Egbert, 1922 — convoluted gall wasp 
 Andricus conglomeratus (Girauld, 1859)
 Andricus conificus (Hartig, 1843)
 Andricus cooki Melika, Nicholls & Stone, 2021
 Andricus coortus Weld, 1947 — club gall wasp
 Andricus coquilletti (Ashmead, 1897) - little oak apple gall wasp
 Andricus coriariformis Melika, Challis & Stone, 2008
 Andricus coriarius (Hartig, 1843)
 Andricus coronatus (Girauld, 1859)
 Andricus coronus  Beutenmueller, 1907
 Andricus corruptrix (Schlechtendal, 1870)
 Andricus costaricensis Pujade-Villar & Melika, 2018
 Andricus costatus Weld, 1944
 Andricus crassicornis (Curtis, 1838)
 Andricus crispator Tschek, 1871
 Andricus cryptobius Wachtl, 1880
 Andricus crystallinus (Bassett, 1900) — crystalline gall wasp
 Andricus csokai Melika & Tavakoli, 2008
 Andricus curtisii (Muller, 1870)
 Andricus curvator (Hartig, 1840)
 Andricus cydoniae Giraud, 1859
 Andricus cylindratum (Kinsey, 1937)
 Andricus deciduatus Weld, 1926
 Andricus dentimitratus (Rejtö, 1887)
 Andricus dimorphus (Beutenmuller, 1913) — clustered midrib gall wasp
 Andricus discalis (Weld, 1927)
 Andricus discularis (Weld, 1927)
 Andricus exclusus (Ratzeburg, 1844)
 Andricus fidelensis Kieffer, 1901
 Andricus fitzpatricki Melika & Abrahamson, 2021
 Andricus flavicornis Schenck, 1863
 Andricus flavus Pujade-Villar, Wang, Guo & Chen, 2014
 Andricus floridus Tavares, 1918
 Andricus foecundatrix (Hartig, 1840)
 Andricus flavohirtus Beutenmüller, 1913
 Andricus foliaformis Weld, 1927
 Andricus formosalis Weld, 1947
 Andricus formosanus Tang & Melika, 2009
 Andricus forni Pujade-Villar & Nicholls, 2020
 Andricus frondeum (Weld, 1957)
 Andricus fulviventris Schenck, 1863
 Andricus furnaceus Kinsey, 1920
 Andricus fuscicornis Hartig, 1841
 Andricus galeatus (Girauld, 1859)
 Andricus gallaecus Tavares, 1916
 Andricus gallaetinctoriae (Olivier, 1791)
 Andricus gallaeurnaeformis (Boyer de Fonscolombe, 1832)
 Andricus gemmeus (Giraud, 1859)
 Andricus gemmicola Kieffer, 1901
 Andricus geniculatus (Dufour, 1864)
 Andricus giardina Stefani, 1898
 Andricus gigas (Kinsey, 1922)—saucer gall wasp
 Andricus glandulae (Hartig, 1840)
 Andricus glutinosus (Girauld, 1859)
 Andricus gracilicornis (Kieffer, 1900)
 Andricus grossulariae (Giraud, 1859)
 Andricus hartigi (Hartig, 1843)
 Andricus hastata (Kinsey, 1937)
 Andricus hedwigia (Kustenmacher, 1894)
 Andricus highlandensis Melika, Nicholls & Stone, 2021
 Andricus hispanicus (Hartig, 1856)
 Andricus howertoni Bassett, 1890
 Andricus hungaricus (Hartig, 1843)
 Andricus hyalinus Hartig, 1841
 Andricus hystrix Kieffer, 1897
 Andricus impropius Ballido & Pujade-Villar, 2003
 Andricus incertus Bassett, 1900
 Andricus indistinctus Bassett, 1890
 Andricus infectorius (Hartig, 1843)
 Andricus inflator Hartig, 1840
 Andricus insanus ](Westwood, 1837)
 Andricus istvani Melika, 2008
 Andricus kashiwaphilus Abe, 1998
 Andricus kingi (Bassett, 1900) — red cone gall wasp
 Andricus kollari (Hartig, 1843)
 Andricus korlevici Kieffer, 1902
 Andricus laevigatus Schenck, 1863
 Andricus lasius (Ashmead, 1896) - hairy gall wasp
 Andricus lateralis (Hartig, 1840)
 Andricus legitimus Wiebes-Rijks, 1980
 Andricus libani Melika, Challis & Stone, 2008
 Andricus lignicolus (Hartig, 1840)
 Andricus longipennis (Ashmead, 1887)
 Andricus lucidus (Hartig, 1843)
 Andricus luisieri Tavares, 1914
 Andricus luteicornis Kieffer, 1899
 Andricus malpighii (Adler, 1881)
 Andricus mammadovi Azmaz & Katilmis, 2021
 Andricus mamillaformis (Weld, 1926)
 Andricus marmoreus Kinsey, 1920
 Andricus maxwelli Bassett, 1890
 Andricus mayri (Wachtl, 1881)
 Andricus megatruncicolus Melika, 2008
 Andricus melikai Pujade-Villar & Kwast, 2002
 Andricus mellificus Melika, Nicholls & Stone, 2021
 Andricus mendocinensis Weld, 1957
 Andricus menkei Melika & Abrahamson, 2021
 Andricus miriami Shachar, 2015
 Andricus mitratus (Mayr, 1870)
 Andricus mogollonensis Melika, Nicholls & Stone, 2021
 Andricus montezumus Beutenmuller, 1913
 Andricus moniliatus Hartig, 1840
 Andricus moreae (Graeffe, 1905)
 Andricus morula Shachar, Inbar & Dorchin, 2017
 Andricus mukaigawae (Mukaigawa, 1913)
 Andricus multiplicatus (Girauld, 1859)
 Andricus murtfeldtae Ashmead, 1896
 Andricus nichollsi Melika & Stone, 2021
 Andricus niger (Fourcroy, 1785)
 Andricus nigricens (Gillette, 1888)
 Andricus nobrei Tavares, 1901
 Andricus nodifex Kieffer, 1900
 Andricus notholithocarpi Melika, Nicholls & Stone, 2018
 Andricus occultatus (Weld, 1926)
 Andricus octosporifex (Schrank, 1802)
 Andricus opertus (Weld, 1926) — fimbriate gall wasp
 Andricus ostrea (Hartig, 1840)
 Andricus pallidicornis (Curtis, 1838)
 Andricus pallipes (Schenck, 1863)
 Andricus panteli (Kieffer, 1896)
 Andricus paradoxus (Radoszkowski, 1866)
 Andricus parmula (Bassett, 1900) — disc gall wasp
 Andricus partali Pujade-Villar, Cuesta-Porta & Hanson, 2022
 Andricus pattersonae Fullaway, 1911 — plate gall wasp
 Andricus pedicellatus Kinsey, 1922 — hair stalk gall wasp
 Andricus peredurus (Kinsey, 1920)
 Andricus perfulvum (Weld, 1952)
 Andricus perlentus (Kinsey, 1937)
 Andricus petioli Hartig, 1843
 Andricus pictus (Hartig, 1856)
 Andricus pilula (Bassett, 1890)
 Andricus pilularis Weld, 1952
 Andricus pisiformis Beutenmueller, 1911
 Andricus polycerus (Girauld, 1859)
 Andricus prescotti Weld, 1952
 Andricus projectus Weld, 1952
 Andricus pseudoaries Melika, Stone & Sadegh, 2008
 Andricus pseudocurvator Tang & Melika, 2011
 Andricus pseudoinflator Tavares, 1901
 Andricus pujadevillari Melika, Stone, Sadeghi, Atkinson & Zargaran, 2008
 Andricus quadrilineatus (Hartig, 1840)
 Andricus quercuscalicis (Burgsdorf, 1783) — knopper gall
 Andricus quercuscalifornicus (Bassett, 1881) — California gall wasp
 Andricus quercuscorticis (Linnaeus, 1761)
 Andricus quercusfoliatus (Ashmead, 1881) — leafy oak gall wasp
 Andricus quercusformosus (Bassett, 1864)
 Andricus quercusfrondosus (Bassett, 1865)
 Andricus quercusinferus (Linnaeus, 1767)
 Andricus quercuslanigera (Ashmead, 1881) — wool-bearing gall wasp
 Andricus quercuslaurinus Melika and Pujade-Villar, 2009
 Andricus quercuspetioli (Linnaeus, 1758)
 Andricus quercuspetiolicola Bassett, 1863 — oak petiole gall wasp
 Andricus quercuspyramidalis (Landois, 1895)
 Andricus quercusradicis (Fabricius, 1798)
 Andricus quercusramuli (Linnaeus, 1761)
 Andricus quercussingularis Bassett, 1863 — small oak apple gall wasp
 Andricus quercustozae (Bosc, 1792)
 Andricus quercusstrobilanus (Osten-Sacken, 1862) — lobed oak gall wasp
 Andricus quercusutriculus (Bassett, 1881)
 Andricus reticulatus Bassett, 1890
 Andricus rhizoxenus (Ashmead, 1896)
 Andricus rhyzomae (Hartig, 1843)
 Andricus robustus Weld, 1926
 Andricus rotundula (Weld, 1952)
 Andricus rubripes (Thomson, 1877)
 Andricus ruficornis (Schenck, 1863)
 Andricus rufipes (Fabricius, 1804)
 Andricus rufiventris Schenck, 1863
 Andricus rufus (Thomson, 1877)
 Andricus rugatus Weld, 1926
 Andricus ruginosus Bassett, 1890
 Andricus sadeghii Melika, Stone, Atkinson & Aligolizade, 2008 
 Andricus schencki Dalla Torre & Kieffer, 1910 
 Andricus schickae Nicholls, Melika & Stone, 2021
 Andricus schoenroggei Melika & Stone, 2008
 Andricus schroeckingeri Wachtl, 1876
 Andricus scutella Weld, 1930
 Andricus seckendorffi (Wachtl, 1879)
 Andricus seminationis (Giraud, 1859)
 Andricus serotinus (Giraud, 1859)
 Andricus serricornis (Kinsey, 1922)
 Andricus sessilum Weld, 1926
 Andricus shuhuti Melika, Mutun & Dinç, 2013
 Andricus sieboldi (Hartig, 1843)
 Andricus singularis Mayr, 1870
 Andricus solitarius (Fonscolombe, 1832)
 Andricus songshui Tang & Melika, 2011
 Andricus sphaericus Pujade-Villar, 2016
 Andricus spicatus (Bassett, 1900)
 Andricus splendens Weld, 1919
 Andricus stefanii (Kieffer, 1897)
 Andricus stellaris Weld, 1926 — sunburst gall wasp
 Andricus stellulus (Burnett, 1974) — stellar gall wasp
 Andricus sternlichti Bellido, Pujade-Villar & Melika, 2003
 Andricus stonei Melika, Tavakoli & Sadeghi, 2014
 Andricus stramineus Weld, 1944
 Andricus stropus Ashmead, 1887
 Andricus strues (Kinsey, 1938)
 Andricus subterranea (Giraud, 1859)
 Andricus sufflator Mayr, 1882
 Andricus sulfureus Weld, 1926
 Andricus superfetationis (Giraud, 1859)
 Andricus surculi (Schrank, 1781)
 Andricus tavaresi Kieffer, 1904
 Andricus tecturnarum Kinsey, 1920
 Andricus testaceipes (Hartig, 1840)
 Andricus testaceus (Gmelin, 1790)
 Andricus texanus Beutenmüller, 1909
 Andricus theophrasteus (Trotter, 1902)
 Andricus tomentosus (Trotter, 1901)
 Andricus torreyaensis Melika & Abrahamson, 2021
 Andricus toumeyi Weld, 1926
 Andricus trotteri Kieffer, 1898
 Andricus truncicola (Girauld, 1859)
 Andricus tubalis Weld, 1926
 Andricus tubifaciens Weld, 1926
 Andricus tubularius Weld, 1926
 Andricus tumefaciens Pujade-Villar & Paretas-Martínez, 2014
 Andricus turcicus Melika, Mutun & Dinç, 2014
 Andricus turionum (Hartig, 1840)
 Andricus vacciniifoliae (Ashmead, 1896) — oak apple wasp
 Andricus villosulus (Gravenhorst, 1807)
 Andricus verensis Weld, 1955
 Andricus vindobonensis Müllner, 1901
 Andricus weldi (Beutenmüller, 1918)
 Andricus wheeleri Beutenmueller, 1907
 Andricus williami Melika, Nicholls & Stone, 2021
 Andricus zappellai Kieffer, 1901

Previous species
These species were previously grouped in Andricus.

Currently in Druon:
 Druon flocculentum Lyon
 Druon fullawayi Beutenmüller, 1914
 Druon ignotum Bassett
 Druon linaria Kinsey
 Druon pattoni (Bassett, 1881)
 Druon protagion Kinsey
 Druon quercusflocci (Walsh, 1864)
 Druon quercuslanigerum Ashmead

References

External links
 

Cynipidae
Hymenoptera genera
Taxa named by Theodor Hartig
Insects described in 1840